TPC at Summerlin is a private golf club in the western United States, located within the planned community of Summerlin in Las Vegas, Nevada.

Opened  in 1991, the championship golf course was designed by Bobby Weed and is a member of the Tournament Players Club network operated by the PGA Tour. It hosts the tour's Shriners Hospitals for Children Open, formerly the Las Vegas Invitational, played in October. The course was featured in the PS1 version of Tiger Woods PGA Tour 2001; it was added to Tiger Woods 99 PGA Tour Golf on PC as part of the Vegas courses expansion pack.

Course layout

References

External links

Shriners Hospitals for Children Open

Golf clubs and courses in Nevada
Sports venues in Las Vegas
Golf clubs and courses designed by Bobby Weed
Golf in Las Vegas
Buildings and structures in Summerlin, Nevada
1991 establishments in Nevada